The 2013 Canadian Mixed Doubles Curling Trials was held from March 14 to 17 at the Leduc Recreation Centre and the Leduc Curling Club in Leduc, Alberta. The winning team of the trials will represent Canada at the 2013 World Mixed Doubles Curling Championship. It is the first ever Canadian Mixed Doubles championship. Previously, two players from the Canadian Mixed Curling Championship winning team were selected to play at the World Mixed Doubles championship.

The various curling members associations scrambled to hold provincial qualifying tournaments. In addition to 12 provincial champion teams, 20 open entries were also invited to compete.

Teams
The teams are listed as follows. Twelve teams qualified through provincial and territorial championships, and the rest will be participating as open entries.

Provincial and Territorial champions

Open entries

Round-robin standings
Final round-robin standings

Round-robin results
All draw times are listed in Mountain Daylight Time (UTC−6).

Draw 1
Thursday, March 14, 1:30 pm

Draw 2
Thursday, March 14, 4:00 pm

Draw 3
Thursday, March 14, 6:30 pm

Draw 4
Thursday, March 14, 9:00 pm

Draw 5
Friday, March 15, 9:00 am

Draw 6
Friday, March 15, 11:30 am

Draw 7
Friday, March 15, 2:00 pm

Draw 8
Friday, March 15, 4:30 pm

Draw 9
Friday, March 15, 7:00 pm

Draw 10
Friday, March 15, 9:30 pm

Draw 11
Saturday, March 16, 9:00 am

Draw 12
Saturday, March 16, 11:30 am

Draw 13
Saturday, March 16, 2:00 pm

Draw 14
Saturday, March 16, 4:30 pm

Playoffs
{{16TeamBracket-Compact-NoSeeds-Byes
| RD1= Round of 12
| RD2= Quarterfinals
| RD3= Semifinals
| RD4= Final
| team-width= 150

| RD1-team01=  Desjardins/Neron
| RD1-score01= 11
| RD1-team02=   Schille/Carmody
| RD1-score02= 4
| RD1-team05=  Young/Duncan
| RD1-score05= 3
| RD1-team06=  Dacey/Smith-Dacey
| RD1-score06= 9
| RD1-team09=  Smallwood/Smallwood
| RD1-score09= 10
| RD1-team10=  Ackerman/Ackerman
| RD1-score10= 5
| RD1-team13=  Kalthoff/Martin
| RD1-score13= 9
| RD1-team14=  Lauber/Boettcher
| RD1-score14= 6

| RD2-team01=  Desjardins/Néron
| RD2-score01= 11
| RD2-team02=  McDonald/Rivington
| RD2-score02= 10
| RD2-team03=  Dacey/Smith-Dacey
| RD2-score03= 7
| RD2-team04=  Grassie/Klein
| RD2-score04= 2
| RD2-team05=  Smallwood/Smallwood
| RD2-score05= 7
| RD2-team06=  Hicke/Eberle
| RD2-score06= 8
| RD2-team07=  Kalthoff/Martin
| RD2-score07= 8
| RD2-team08=  Armstrong/Quick
| RD2-score08= 5

| RD3-team01=  Desjardins/Néron
| RD3-score01= 7
| RD3-team02=  Dacey/Smith-Dacey
| RD3-score02= 6
| RD3-team03=  Hicke/Eberle
| RD3-score03= 6
| RD3-team04=  Kalthoff/Martin
| RD3-score04= 7

| RD4-team01=  Desjardins/Néron
| RD4-score01= 7'| RD4-team02=  Kalthoff/Martin
| RD4-score02= 3
}}

Round of 12Saturday, March 16, 8:30 pmQuarterfinalsSunday, March 17, 10:00 amSemifinalsSunday, March 17, 1:00 pmFinalSunday, March 17, 4:00 pm''

References

External links
 (web archive)

Canadian Mixed Doubles Curling Championship
Mixed Doubles Trials
Curling in Alberta
Mixed Doubles Curling Trials
Canadian Mixed Doubles Curling Trials
Leduc, Alberta